is a Japanese football player for SC Sagamihara.

Club statistics
Updated to 23 February 2020.

References

External links
Profile at Matsumoto Yamaga

1987 births
Living people
Komazawa University alumni
Association football people from Saitama Prefecture
Japanese footballers
J1 League players
J2 League players
J3 League players
Vissel Kobe players
Mito HollyHock players
Matsumoto Yamaga FC players
Roasso Kumamoto players
SC Sagamihara players
Association football forwards
Universiade bronze medalists for Japan
Universiade medalists in football
Medalists at the 2009 Summer Universiade